Abdilwali Hersi Abdille Indhaguran (var. Abdiweli Hirsi Abdulle (Indhoguran), ; born 1969) is a former minister of electricity and power generation of the Transitional National Government (TNG) of Somalia, and Minister of Labor, Youth and Sports for the Puntland region.
From 1992 to 1997 he was minister of labour and social affairs of Somali region state of Ethiopia and head of social affairs sector. From 1994 to 1997 he was Head of Disaster Prevention and Preparedness committee of Somali regional state of Ethiopia and member of parliament.

References

Government ministers of Somalia
1969 births
Living people